Yuriy Zelikovich (born 7 May 1964) is a Soviet rower. He competed in the men's quadruple sculls event at the 1988 Summer Olympics.

References

1964 births
Living people
Soviet male rowers
Olympic rowers of the Soviet Union
Rowers at the 1988 Summer Olympics
Place of birth missing (living people)